The name Julia has been used for three tropical cyclones in the Atlantic Ocean and one subtropical medicane.

In the Atlantic:
 Hurricane Julia (2010) – Category 4 hurricane, churned across the open ocean without threatening land
 Tropical Storm Julia (2016) – weak tropical storm, formed inland over Florida then caused minor damage along the Atlantic Coast of the United States
 Hurricane Julia (2022) – deadly Category 1 hurricane that made landfall in Nicaragua, crossed over intact into the eastern Pacific Ocean

In the Mediterranean:
 Cyclone Julia (2012) – brought heavy flooding and hurricane conditions to parts of Europe, the Mediterranean region and North Africa

Atlantic hurricane set index articles